Merton W. Herrick was a member of the Wisconsin State Assembly.

Biography
Herrick was born on November 19, 1834 in Orleans County, New York. He attended Genesee Wesleyan Seminary before moving to Hammond, Wisconsin in 1857. On March 23, 1859, Herrick married Lois E. Willard. They would have five children. During the American Civil War, Herrick enlisted with the 13th Wisconsin Volunteer Infantry Regiment. Later, he was commissioned an officer with the 48th Wisconsin Volunteer Infantry Regiment by Governor James T. Lewis. Herrick died on March 24, 1907. He was a member of the Methodist Episcopal Church.

Political career
Herrick was a member of the Assembly in 1881. Previously, he had been Treasurer of St. Croix County, Wisconsin from 1867 to 1872 and a member of the St. Croix County Board of Supervisors.

References

See also
The Political Graveyard

People from Orleans County, New York
People from St. Croix County, Wisconsin
Members of the Wisconsin State Assembly
County supervisors in Wisconsin
People of Wisconsin in the American Civil War
Union Army officers
Union Army soldiers
Methodists from Wisconsin
20th-century Methodists
19th-century Methodists
Genesee Wesleyan Seminary alumni
1834 births
1907 deaths